Carolyn Fluehr-Lobban is an anthropologist and Sudanist and a co-founder and past president of the Sudan Studies Association.  Fluehr-Lobban is a specialist in Islamic law, anthropology and ethics, human rights, cultural relativism and universal rights, and has authored texts books on Islamic societies and on race and racism.  She is Professor Emeritus of Anthropology at Rhode Island College, Providence, Rhode Island; also a lecturer at the Naval War College. She is also a beekeeper and lectures on bees and beekeeping.

Life
Carolyn Fluehr-Lobban received her BA and MA degrees in Anthropology from Temple University, and her PhD from Northwestern University in 1973.  She is married to the archaeologist Richard Lobban, whom she met in  Temple University's Department of Anthropology.  Together, they established the Dr. Richard A. Lobban, Jr. and Dr. Carolyn B. Fluehr-Lobban Pre-Dissertation Research Award in Anthropology at Temple University.

Publications

Books 

As editor

As co-editor

Articles

Academic

General

References

American anthropologists
American women anthropologists
Living people
Year of birth missing (living people)
21st-century American women